Deh Fish Rural District is a rural district (dehestan) in Banaruiyeh District, Larestan County, Fars Province, Iran. At the 2006 census, its population was 3,966, in 826 families.  The rural district has 6 villages.

References 

Rural Districts of Fars Province
Larestan County